is a Japanese actor and singer affiliated with Clutch Corporation/Yamaha Corporation. Since 2007, Ueda has been involved with 2.5D musicals and other musical theatre productions, most notably as Choromatsu from Osomatsu-san on Stage: Six Men's Show Time, Yukine from the Noragami stage plays, Misaki Yata from the K stage plays, Japan from the Hetalia musicals, Pharos and Ryoji Mochizuki from Persona 3: The Weird Masquerade, Chuya Nakahara from the Bungo Stray Dogs stage plays, and Syo Kurusu from the Uta no Prince-sama: Gekidan Shining musicals. He portrayed Sangaku Manami in both the Yowamushi Pedal stage plays and the live-action drama adaptation. As a voice actor, his leading roles include Heine Wittgenstein from The Royal Tutor and Hiroki from Pet, who he also portrayed in the tie-in stage adaptations.

Alongside of his acting career, Ueda debuted as a singer in 2018 with the song "Start Line (Toki no Wadachi)", with his first album, Voice of.. released in 2019.

Career

Acting career

Ueda was a finalist in the 19th Junon Super Boy Contest held in 2006. In 2007, he debuted as an actor in the stage play Osaero. In the same year, he was cast in his first leading role as Abe no Masahiro in the stage adaptation of Shōnen Onmyōji. Throughout his early theatre career, Ueda worked with the all-male theatre troupe Gekidan Studio Life. Ueda also had guest roles in Unubore Deka and Kamen Rider Wizard on television, but after being cast as Sangaku Manami from the Yowamushi Pedal stage plays, he reprised his role for the live-action drama series in his first regular role.

In 2013, Ueda made his voice acting debut in Yamishibai: Japanese Ghost Stories. In 2017, he was cast in his first anime leading role as Heine Wittgenstein in The Royal Tutor, who he also portrayed in the musicals.

Music career

In 2016, Ueda collaborated with the music label Aquamarine for their Otogimmick music project. The Sleeping Beauty-inspired "Nemuri-hime" was released on December 23, 2016 in "Prince" and "Devil" editions. The single charted at #123 on the Oricon Weekly Singles Chart.

On May 30, 2018, Ueda released his debut single, "Start Line (Toki no Wadachi)" as part of the "Bogland Music" project between Yamaha Music Communications and stage actors. The song was featured as the ending theme to the television program +Music and peaked at #25 on the Oricon Weekly Singles Chart.

Discography

Albums

Singles

As lead artist

As featured artist

Soundtrack appearances

Filmography

Theatre

Music video

Television

Film

Anime

Publications

Photo books

References

External links
  
 Yamaha Music Communications profile

1989 births
Living people
21st-century Japanese male actors
Japanese male stage actors
Japanese male musical theatre actors
Japanese male voice actors
Male voice actors from Osaka Prefecture
Musicians from Osaka